The Consulta Araldica was a college instituted by royal decree on 10 October 1869 to advise the Italian government on noble titles, coats of arms and related matters. It was a department of the Ministry of the Interior, combining the roles of the various heraldic colleges which had existed in pre-unification Italy, including the Tribunale Araldico of Lombardy, the Commissione Araldica of Venice and the Congregazione Araldica Capitolina of Rome.

The Consulta Araldica was dissolved following the adoption of the Constitution of the Italian Republic in 1948 and the abolition of state recognition and regulation of noble titles.  Although today no government official or office can grant titles of nobility, some of the Consulta Araldica's functions are still performed by the Heraldic Office  within the Office of the Prime Minister.

Despite its name, the Consulta Araldica rarely dealt with armorial heraldry. However, an official Blasonario, or armorial, was in an early draft stage when the monarchy was abolished in 1946. Plans had called for this to include the blazons of Italian families whether titled or not.

For Italian titles please refer to the Consulta Araldica's official directories approved by the Council of Ministers and by Royal Decree – Libro d'Oro della Nobiltà Italiana. The Corpo della Nobiltà Italiana is a private association. Other nobility associations exist as well.

Further reading

References
This article was originally based on its counterpart in the Italian Wikipedia, as retrieved on 2006-09-24:  Consulta Araldica.

Heraldic authorities
Italian heraldry
Italian nobility
Government agencies established in 1869
Government agencies disestablished in 1948
1869 establishments in Italy